The Men's 200 metres T46 event at the 2012 Summer Paralympics took place at the London Olympic Stadium on 31 August and 2 September.
 
 The event was also open to category T45 double arm amputees, and the gold medal was won by T45 athlete Yohansson Nascimento of Brazil.

Records
Prior to the competition, the existing World and Paralympic records were as follows:

Results

Round 1
Competed 31 August 2012 from 21:00. Qual. rule: first 2 in each heat (Q) plus the 2 fastest other times (q) qualified.

Heat 1

Heat 2

Heat 3

Final
Competed 2 September 2012 at 19:30.

 
Q = qualified by place. q = qualified by time. WR = World Record. PR = Paralympic Record. RR = Regional Record. PB = Personal Best. SB = Seasonal Best. DQ = Disqualified. DNS = Did not start. DNF = Did not finish.

References

Athletics at the 2012 Summer Paralympics
2012 in men's athletics